Botanix Pharmaceuticals is listed on the Australian Securities Exchange with the issue code BOT. The Company is headquartered in Perth, Western Australia and Philadelphia, USA. It is a clinical stage synthetic cannabinoid company, focusing on the compound Cannabidiol. The company has two separate development platforms, dermatology and antimicrobial. Botanix also has an exclusive license to use a proprietary drug delivery system Permetrex, for direct skin delivery of active pharmaceuticals which is utilised in all of their programs.

Research
Botanix Pharmaceuticals product pipeline currently includes four programs for treatment of serious skin diseases:

Dermatology
 BTX 1503, for the treatment of moderate to severe acne
 BTX 1702, for the treatment of rosacea
 BTX 1204A, for the treatment of moderate atopic dermatitis
Antimicrobial
 BTX 1801, for use in a variety of antimicrobial applications

References

External links 

 

Biotechnology companies of Australia
Companies based in Perth, Western Australia
Biotechnology companies established in 2002
Australian companies established in 2002
Cannabis and health